The Kansas Supreme Court is the highest judicial authority in the state of Kansas. Composed of seven justices, led by Chief Justice Marla Luckert, the court supervises the legal profession, administers the judicial branch, and serves as the state court of last resort in the appeals process.

Functions

Judicial
The Kansas Supreme Court's most important duty is being the state court of last resort and the highest judicial authority in the state of Kansas. The Court rarely conducts a trial. Its judicial responsibilities include hearing direct appeals from the district courts in the most serious criminal cases and appeals in any case in which a statute has been held unconstitutional. The Court has the authority to review cases decided by the Court of Appeals and the ability to transfer cases to the U.S. Supreme Court.

Administration
The Kansas Supreme Court must adopt and submit to the Kansas Legislature an annual budget for the entire judicial branch of Kansas government.

Supervision
According to the Kansas Constitution, the Court has general administrative authority over all Kansas courts. Its rules govern the appellate practice in the Kansas Court of Appeals and the Supreme Court. It sets the procedures in the district courts. It also provides oversight to the legal profession by setting rules that provide for the examination and admission of attorneys within the state, the code of professional responsibility which governs the conduct of attorneys, and include the canons of judicial ethics which regulate the conduct of judges. Lastly it sets the rules for the examination and certification of official court reports. To ensure compliance the Court may discipline attorneys, judges, and nonjudicial employees.

Justices

Selection process
When a vacancy opens up on the Kansas Supreme Court, the Kansas Supreme Court Nominating Commission submits a list of three qualified individuals to the Governor of Kansas. The Commission is composed of five lawyer members and four non-lawyer members. One lawyer and one non-lawyer member must be from each of Kansas's congressional districts, and one additional lawyer member who serves as the chairperson. Lawyer members are elected by their peers in each individual congressional district while the non-lawyer members are appointed by the governor.

Eligibility requirements 
A nominee must be: 

 at least 30 years old; and (there is no maximum age) Article 3 § 7
 a lawyer admitted to practice in Kansas and engaged in the practice of law for at least 10 years, whether as a lawyer, judge, or full-time teacher at an accredited law school. 

If a person meets these requirements and wants to be considered for the office, they must complete a detailed nomination form summarizing their educational, professional, community, and financial background. The Kansas Supreme Court Nominating Commission reviews the nomination forms and chooses which potential nominees merit an interview.

The interviews are conducted in the Supreme Court’s Conference Room in Topeka. Generally the interview process will take a day and a half. There is no official set of questions, but topics such as the potential nominees’ legal scholarship, professional experience, writing ability, and community service are normally covered. The Commission also receives letters of recommendation and other background information on the candidates. Once the interviews are complete, the commission enters into discussion to reduce the list to the top six to eight nominees. Then the commission votes by secret ballot until a list of three nominees is chosen by majority vote to submit to the Governor.

Appointments
The governor then selects one of the three from the Commission's list to become a justice. If the Governor fails to make an appointment within 60 days the choice is then made by the Chief Justice of the Kansas Supreme Court. After the first year in office, the justice undergoes a retention vote in the next general election. The justice receiving approval from a majority of electors remain in office for a 6-year term. After the conclusion of each term the justice must face another retention vote. Retirement is mandatory at age 75 or upon completion of the justice's current term.

The justice who has the longest continuous service is designated by the Kansas Constitution as the chief justice, unless the justice declines or resigns the position. The chief justice's duty is to exercise the administrative authority of the court. This merit system or Missouri Plan has been used in Kansas since 1958, voted in by Kansans upset when Governor Fred Hall resigned after losing the gubernatorial primary so he could be appointed to the Supreme Court by his successor Governor John McCuish.

Current justices

The Kansas Supreme Court has seven current justices. One of the current justices graduated from an out-of-state law school.  Current membership includes three women (Luckert, Wilson and Standridge), two alumni of the University of Kansas School of Law (Stegall and Wall), and four alumni of Washburn University School of Law (Luckert, Rosen, Biles and Wilson) and one from the University of Missouri–Kansas City School of Law (Standridge). The appointment of Dan Biles by Governor Sebelius marked the first time a majority of the court had been appointed by one person.

Removing a justice
Due to the checks and balances of the judicial branch with the legislative and executive branches, it is difficult to remove a Justice. Usually a Justice either dies, retires by choice, or retires after surpassing the state age limit of 75. A Justice may be removed by impeachment and conviction as specified in Article 3 of the Kansas Constitution. Justices can also be forced to retire upon certification to the governor after a hearing by the Supreme Court Nominating Commission that the Justice is so incapacitated as to be unable to perform the duties of the office.

History
Following the passage of the Kansas–Nebraska Act in 1854, President Franklin Pierce appointed Samuel Dexter LeCompte as the first chief justice of the Supreme Court of the Kansas Territory.

In 1900 a constitutional amendment was made changing the complement of the court from three justices to seven. 
Initially the court worked in two separate divisions in an attempt to catch up with the four year case backlog that had built up. 
By 1922 this had succeeded and the court sat complete with all seven justices hearing cases and disposing of cases "just as fast as they can be presented".

Notable cases

State v. Limon
In State v. Limon (2005), the Kansas Supreme Court unanimously struck down part of a law that sentenced Matthew Limon to prison over a decade longer than a heterosexual would have received because of different age of consent laws for homosexuals.

Montoy v. Kansas
The court ruled in 2005 that the $2.7 billion in school funding was inadequate and distributed unfairly. It then recommend the Kansas legislature increase funding to schools and change the way the money was distributed. Many Republicans saw this as an act of judicial activism leading to some calls for changes in how justices are selected.

Kansas v. Marsh
The Court ruled in Kansas v. Marsh (2006) that the Kansas death penalty was unconstitutional because the Eighth Amendment prohibits imposing death when mitigating and aggravating sentencing factors were equally balanced. The United States Supreme Court disagreed and reversed in a 5–4 decision.

Kline v. Tiller
The Court unanimously allowed then Attorney General Phill Kline to examine the abortion records of 90 women to investigate possible crimes. It later blocked Kline from pursuing 30 misdemeanor criminal charges against Dr. George Tiller after he lost office. The case was a major issue in the 2006 defeat of Kline by former prosecutor and then-Attorney General Paul J. Morrison whose investigation found no crimes.

Hermesmann v. Seyer

The Court ruled in Hermesmann v. Seyer (1993) that a woman is entitled to sue the father of her child for child support even if conception occurred as a result of a criminal act, including statutory rape, committed by the woman against the father. It also ruled that a mother's potential culpability under the criminal statutes was of no relevance in determining the father's child support liability.

Hodes & Nauser, MDs, PA, et al v. Derek Schmidt, et al.

The Court ruled in 2019 that the Kansas Constitution Bill of Rights sets forth rights that are broader than and distinct from the rights in the Fourteenth Amendment to the United States Constitution. Specifically, Section 1 of the Kansas Constitution Bill of Rights affords protection of the right of personal autonomy, which includes the ability to control one's own body, to assert bodily integrity, and to exercise self-determination. This right allows a woman to make her own decisions regarding her body, health, family formation, and family life—decisions that can include whether to continue a pregnancy. The State may only infringe upon the right to decide whether to continue a pregnancy if the State has a compelling interest and has narrowly tailored its actions to that interest. In 2022, Kansas voters rejected a proposed amendment to the state constitution that would have overruled Hodes & Nasuer v. Schmidt.

See also 
 Courts of Kansas
 List of justices of the Kansas Supreme Court

References

External links 
Kansas Supreme Court

 
State supreme courts of the United States
Kansas law
Kansas state courts
1854 establishments in Kansas Territory
Courts and tribunals established in 1854